The Thai Embassy in Washington, D.C. is the diplomatic mission of the Kingdom of Thailand to the United States.  The embassy is located at 1024 Wisconsin Avenue, Northwest, Washington, D.C. in the Georgetown neighborhood.  

The ambassador is Manasvi Srisodapol.

See also
Thailand–United States relations
Embassy of the United States, Bangkok
Codman–Davis House, the ambassador's residence

References

External links

 Official website
 Thai Embassies & Consulates in the United States

Thailand
Washington, D.C.
Georgetown (Washington, D.C.)
Thailand–United States relations